Park Hae-jin (born May 1, 1983) is a South Korean actor. He is best known for his supporting roles in dramas My Love from the Star (2013) and Doctor Stranger (2014), and his leading roles in Bad Guys (2014), Cheese in the Trap (2016), Man to Man (2017), Forest (2020), Kkondae Intern (2020), and From Now On, Showtime! (2022).

Career

2006–2011: Beginnings
Park began his acting career in KBS weekend drama Famous Chil Princesses, for which he won the Best New Actor award at the 43rd Baeksang Arts Awards. He then starred in two highly successful TV projects - KBS daily drama Heaven & Earth with Han Hyo-joo, and MBC anniversary drama East of Eden. In 2009, Park joined the cast of SBS reality variety show Family Outing, which gave him more exposure. He then got his first lead role in the KBS youth drama Hot Blood.

2012–2015: Rising popularity and East Asian success
In 2011, Park starred in first Chinese drama Qian Duo Duo Marry Remember, which aired on Hunan TV. The drama earned 1.5 billion views in two weeks and its broadcast rights were sold to Japan. Park won the 'Asia Star Award' at the 2012 LeTV Awards, making him the first Korean actor to receive the award. Park also starred in two other dramas Another Brilliant Life and Love Relativity. Due to his rising popularity, a cinema screen by Lotte Cinema in China was named after him.

He then returned to the small screen back in Korea, starring in Seoyoung, My Daughter (2012). The drama became the highest-rated Korean drama of 2013 with a peak rating of 47.6%, and Park gained more recognition with the public. This was followed by supporting roles in fantasy romance series My Love From the Star (2013) and medical drama Doctor Stranger (2014). Both dramas became successful in China, launching Park into stardom as a Hallyu star.

In late 2014, Park starred in OCN's crime thriller Bad Guys. He received the KDA Award at the 2015 Korea Drama Awards for his performance. In 2015, Park made his film debut as lead actor in the romance film Snow is on the Sea opposite Lee Young-ah.

2016–present: Breakthrough in Korea
In 2016, Park played the leading role in tvN's Cheese in the Trap, adapted from the webtoon of the same name. The drama gained success in China, and topped Weibo's Korean-Japanese TV drama chart with over 1.9 billion views. Park experienced a rise in popularity and received increased endorsement offers. He also received the Best Actor award at the 2016 Korean Cable TV Awards. Following the success of Cheese in the Trap, Park was confirmed to reprise his role as Yoo Jung in the film adaptation of the webtoon, which was released in 2018.

The same year, he starred in Chinese drama Far Away Love, playing a successful businessman who owns an upscale restaurant and falls in love with a destitute woman. He was awarded the ‘Male Actor of the Year’ award at LeTV Entertainment Awards held in Beijing, China. Park's overseas success led to him being featured on Chinese postage stamps, making him the first Korean to be on Chinese stamps that are released as both regular issue and limited edition. On November 2, 2016, it was announced that Park would star in a web drama titled First Seven Kisses for Lotte Duty Free.

In 2017, Park's wax figure was unveiled at Madame Tussauds Hong Kong. The same year, he starred in JTBC's spy-action drama Man to Man. The drama drew attention in China and was heavily featured on local media despite the country's ban on Korean cultural content and celebrities.

In 2017, Park was cast in the romance thriller Four Men, which was set to air in 2018 but faced multiple delays and production was later cancelled due to contractual breach.

In 2020, Park starred in the romantic comedy drama Forest as a special emergency rescue team worker. The same year, he was cast in the revenge workplace drama Kkondae Intern.

In 2021, Park was cast in the romantic comedy drama From Now On, Showtime! as a popular magician who has the secret ability to see and communicate with ghosts. The drama premiered in April 2022.

In 2022, Park releases a second photobook, Only you Park Hae-jin, which will be published in late January 2022, and will be the release of the photobook in two years. Later, in June 2022, Park decided not to renew his contract with the original agency. In July 2022, Park signed a contract with Artist Company.

Personal life
Park Hae-jin's parents were divorced when he was young and he moved back in with his mother after 17 years of separation.
Park is known to be a collector of shoes, particularly sneakers. He has admitted to owning more than 1800 pairs of footwear.

Other activities

Ambassador roles

Philanthropy
Park's consistent donations to various charities for the past few years which earned him the title “donation angel” in the entertainment industry. Mountain Movement confirmed Park has donated a total of 1.7 billion won (S$1.5 million) in various local and international charities since 2011.

In 2014, he was given the Civil Public Welfare Award in China. In 2015, Park became the 8th Korean celebrity to join the Honor Society by Community Chest of Korea. He was also the first recipient of the Haengbok Nanuminsang (행복나눔인상, “Happiness Sharer’s Award”), given by the Minister of Health and Welfare.

Since 2015, Park has donated to the Hae Sim Won child welfare facility and has continued to do so regularly.

In 2017, Park began a campaign to reduce fine dust by planting trees in China where he and his fans donated 6520 trees. In April 2018, Park planted 6000 more trees together with his fans to help the battle against desertification in Western China.

Filmography

Film

Television series

Web series

Television shows

Music video appearances

Awards and nominations

Notes

References

External links 
 

1983 births
Living people
People from Busan
South Korean male film actors
South Korean male models
South Korean male television actors
South Korean male web series actors
21st-century South Korean male actors
Best New Actor Paeksang Arts Award (television) winners